Dincă Schileru was a Romanian footballer and manager. Schileru was the coach that won the 1957–58 Cupa României, which was the first trophy in Politehnica Timișoara's history. In 2008 he received post-mortem the Honorary Citizen of Timișoara title.

International career
Dincă Schileru played two friendly games at international level for Romania, making his debut in a 4–1 victory against Poland in which he scored the opening goal in the first minute of the game.

Honours

Player
Unirea Tricolor București
Cupa României runner-up: 1935–36

Manager
Politehnica Timișoara
Cupa României: 1957–58
Siderurgistul Galați
Divizia B: 1962–63
Boluspor
Prime Minister's Cup: 1970

References

External links

Dincă Schileru player profile at Labtof.ro
Dincă Schileru manager profile at Labtof.ro

Date of death missing
Footballers from Bucharest
Romanian footballers
Romania international footballers
Association football forwards
Liga I players
Unirea Tricolor București players
FC Sportul Studențesc București players
Valenciennes FC players
Romanian expatriate footballers
Expatriate footballers in France
Romanian expatriates in France
Romanian expatriate sportspeople in France
Romanian football managers
Romanian expatriate football managers
Expatriate football managers in Turkey
Romanian expatriate sportspeople in Turkey
Süper Lig managers
FC Progresul București managers
CA Oradea managers
FC Politehnica Timișoara managers
Boluspor managers
Göztepe S.K. managers